John Calhoon (April 13, 1793October 15, 1852) was a United States representative from Kentucky. He was born in Henry County, Kentucky in 1797. He studied law, was admitted to the bar, and practiced.

Calhoon was a member of the Kentucky House of Representatives in 1820, 1821, 1829, and 1830. He was unsuccessful candidate for election to the Twentieth Congress. He received the credentials of an election as an Adams candidate to the Twentieth Congress, held November 5–7, 1827, to fill the vacancy caused by the death of United States Representative William S. Young, but, in order to avoid a contest, resigned and, together with his opponent, Thomas Chilton, petitioned the Governor of Kentucky for a new election. He was again unsuccessful in this election.

Calhoon was elected as an Anti-Jacksonian to the Twenty-fourth Congress and as a Whig to the Twenty-fifth Congress (March 4, 1835 – March 3, 1839) and was not a candidate for reelection to the Twenty-sixth Congress. After leaving Congress, he moved to St. Louis, Missouri in 1839 and resumed the practice of law. He returned to Kentucky and was appointed judge of the fourteenth judicial district in January 1842. He died in 1852 in Louisville, Kentucky.

He is the namesake of Calhoun, Kentucky, the seat of McLean County.

References

1793 births
1852 deaths
People from Henry County, Kentucky
American people of Scotch-Irish descent
National Republican Party members of the United States House of Representatives from Kentucky
Whig Party members of the United States House of Representatives from Kentucky
Members of the Kentucky House of Representatives
Kentucky lawyers